Petrolândia (Petroland, named in honour of Dom Pedro II) is a municipality in the state of Pernambuco, Brazil. It is in the São Francisco Region. Petrolândia has a total area of 1056.6 square kilometers and had an estimated population of 36,901 inhabitants in 2020 according to the IBGE. It has one of the largest GDP per capita of Sertão due to the location of one hydroelectric power plant, property of CHESF.

Languages
The Kambiwá language, now extinct, was spoken in the village of Barreira in Petrolândia.

Geography

 State - Pernambuco
 Region - São Francisco Region
 Boundaries - Floresta (N), Jatobá (S), Tacaratu (E) and  Bahia state (W)
 Area - 1056.6 km2
 Elevation - 282 m
 Hydrography - Moxotó River, tributary of São Francisco River
 Vegetation - Caatinga hiperxerofila
 Climate - semi-arid hot
 Annual average temperature - 25.7 c
 Main road -  BR 232, BR BR 110, BR 316
 Distance to Recife - 430 km

Economy

The main economic activities in Petrolândia are based in commerce, energy and transportation industry, plus  primary sector especially fruits such as coconuts, bananas, goiaba; and creations of goats, sheep, bulls and chickens. The energy sector due to the presence of Chesf is the most important activity.

Transport
From 1881 to 1964 Petrolândia was the terminus of a single track railway, known as the Estrada de Ferro Paulo Afonso. This railway was constructed to bypass rapids and waterfalls on the São Francisco River by linking the upper limit of navigation of the Lower São Francisco at Piranhas, with the lower limit of navigation of the Upper São Francisco at Petrolândia.

Indicators

Economic Indicators

Economy by Sector
2006

Health Indicators

References

Municipalities in Pernambuco